Alexandru Marghiloman (4 July 1854 – 10 May 1925) was a Romanian conservative statesman who served for a short time in 1918 (March–October) as Prime Minister of Romania, and had a decisive role during World War I.

Early career
Born in Buzău, he entered the Saint Sava National College in Bucharest, and then studied Law in Paris. Marghiloman was elected to the Romanian Parliament in 1884, and joined the government in 1888.

A member of the Conservative Party, he supported cooperation with the German Empire and Austria-Hungary in the Triple Alliance, and, at the beginning of World War I, he favoured neutrality. Romania remained neutral until 1916, when she entered on the Allied side and this was the reason he refused a seat in the Ion Brătianu's liberal government.

After the Germans occupied Bucharest, he remained there as the president of the Romanian Red Cross, and acted as a mediator between the German occupation authorities and the Romanian population. He rejected the ideas of the German side of forming a parallel administration to King Ferdinand I's government that was moved to Iaşi.

Cabinet and later years

However, since Bolshevist Russia withdrew from the war and the Germans could occupy the rest of Romania, King Ferdinand requested Marghiloman to become a Prime Minister, hoping that with a pro-German Prime Minister it would be easier to make peace with the Germans, and knowing that Germany would consider the Western Front to be much more important.

Indeed, Marghiloman negotiated and signed a peace treaty (known as the Treaty of Bucharest) with the Central Powers on 7 May 1918, which proved to be very punitive and restrictive for Romania. However, this treaty was never ratified. Marghiloman's cabinet fell after the Compiègne armistice, and it was replaced quickly with the pro-Allied General Constantin Coandă on 6 November, under whose cabinet Romania re-entered the war against Germany on 10 November, a day before the end of the war. Retired from public life following the collapse of Conservative politicians in post-war Greater Romania, Marghiloman died in his native town.

Trivia

In his private life, Marghiloman was also an enthusiastic horse breeder: horses owned by him won the Romanian Derby 28 times. His large estate, the Albatros Villa (named after one of his horses) in Buzău, was for a long time a meeting place for Conservative politicians.  He also had a mansion in Sinești, which was built in 1869–1874.

Marghiloman gave his name to Marghiloman coffee, Turkish coffee boiled in brandy.

References

Further reading
 George D. Nicolescu, Parlamentul Român (1866–1901) ("Romanian Parliament (1866–1901)"), I. V. Socecu, Bucharest, 1903
 Mircea Dumitriu, "Alexandru Marghiloman, omul nemtilor sau omul providential?" ("Alexandru Marghiloman, the German's man or the man of providence?"), in România Liberă, 13 October 2007; accessed 3 September 2010
 "DOSARE DECLASIFICATE / Perchezitionarea premierului Marghiloman" ("Declassified files/Search of prime minister Marghiloman"), in Ziarul Financiar, 29 January 2009; accessed 3 September 2010

1854 births
1925 deaths
People from Buzău
People of the Principality of Wallachia
Conservative Party (Romania, 1880–1918) politicians
Prime Ministers of Romania
Romanian Ministers of Agriculture
Romanian Ministers of Finance
Romanian Ministers of Justice
Romanian Ministers of Foreign Affairs
Romanian Ministers of Public Works
Romanian Ministers of Interior
Members of the Chamber of Deputies (Romania)
Members of the Senate of Romania
Romanian people of World War I
Saint Sava National College alumni